Punch Coomaraswamy (16 October 1925 – 8 January 1999) was a Singaporean judge, diplomat and politician who served as Speaker of the Parliament of Singapore between 1966 and 1970, and Singapore Ambassador to the United States between 1976 and 1984.

He had also served as Singapore's Ambassador to Australia, Bangladesh, Brazil, Fiji, India, and Sri Lanka.

Education
Coomaraswamy was the son of Kandiah and Chellam Coomaraswamy. Kandiah Coomaraswamy was a medical doctor who served in the then Straits Settlements Medical Service from 1916 to 1955, when he retired. Coomaraswamy received his early education at the English College in Johor and later obtained his law degree from the University of Nottingham in England.

Career
Coomaraswamy practised in the firm of Braddell Brothers as an advocate during the 1950s and 1960s. From 1958 to 1960, he was appointed the Honorary Secretary of Singapore Bar Council. He was a visiting lecturer in the law of evidence at the University of Singapore (now National University of Singapore) from 1959 to 1969. From 1961 to 1969, he was a lecturer for the Board of Legal Education, Singapore. During his time as a lawyer, Coomaraswamy represented convicted murderer Sunny Ang in his trial, where Ang was accused of murdering his girlfriend for her insurance. Ang was executed in 1967.

In February 1966, he was appointed the Deputy Speaker of Parliament and in August of the same year, he was appointed the Speaker of Parliament. He was the Acting President of Singapore from 5 March to 5 May 1968. Dr Yeoh Ghim Seng took over as the Speaker of the Parliament in January 1970.

His first appointment with the Ministry of Foreign Affairs was from January 1970 to July 1973 as Singapore's High Commissioner to India, Sri Lanka, Nepal and Bangladesh.
From July 1973 to September 1976, he was Singapore's High Commissioner to Australia and Fiji, and from October 1976 to August 1984, he was Singapore's Ambassador to the United States and Brazil.

He served as a Supreme Court judge from 7 September 1984 to 15 October 1993.

High profile cases

One of the cases presided by Coomaraswamy as a judge was the 1987 case of Teo Boon Ann, a 26-year-old temple medium charged with killing 66-year-old Chong Kin Meng during a failed robbery attempt. Together with then Judicial Commissioner Chan Sek Keong, Coomaraswamy rejected Teo's claims of killing the victim in self-defense, and instead, they found that Teo had intentionally and cruelly killed Chong to avoid leaving her alive as a witness to identify him. As such, both Chan and Coomaraswamy found Teo guilty of murder and sentenced him to death.

Another was the case of Nyu Kok Meng, a Malaysian armed robber who was an accomplice of Sek Kim Wah, a serial killer who roped Nyu in to commit robbery at a Andrew Road bungalow before he killed three out of the five hostages. Nyu did not take part in the killings and instead, he protected the remaining two hostages from Sek's murderous rampage. Coomaraswamy, who found Nyu guilty of committing armed robbery with a rifle, took into consideration that Nyu never harmed the victims and willingly gave himself up to the police, and thus he erred on the side of leniency and sentenced Nyu to life imprisonment and the mandatory minimum of six strokes of the cane.

Coomaraswamy was also the trial judge of the 1988 Lee Chee Poh case. The case was about Lee, a 50-year-old widow, masterminding the 1984 murder of her 39-year-old husband Frankie Tan, who was often abusive to Lee and even brought a mistress home after having multiple affairs, and fathered a son with the woman. In sentencing Lee to seven years' imprisonment for a reduced charge of manslaughter, Coomaraswamy took into consideration Lee's regret for the crime and also expressed his deep sympathy for Lee over the emotional abuse caused by her husband's treachery, which drove her to ask her brother-in-law and three others to kill Tan, whom Coomaraswamy condemned as a "callous" person for bringing his pregnant lover home and abused his wife Lee in cold blood.

Family and death
Coomaraswamy married Kaila on 9 November 1956 and had three children from the marriage. He  died in his sleep on 8 January 1999 as a result of chronic lung disease caused by smoking. One of his sons, Vinodh Coomaraswamy, is currently a judge in the High Court of Singapore.

Awards
1946: Pacific War (1941 to 1945) Medal (United Kingdom)
1976: Public Service Star Award
1980: Meritorious Service Medal

References

External links
A Tribute to Punch Coomaraswamy

1925 births
1999 deaths
Ambassadors of Singapore to the United States
Speakers of the Parliament of Singapore
20th-century Singaporean judges
Singaporean expatriates in India